The Samyang 24mm f/1.4 ED AS UMC is an interchangeable wide-angle prime lens for cameras with full frame or smaller sensors. It was announced by Samyang on August 12, 2011.

References

024
Camera lenses introduced in 2011